Tony Okada is a former member of the US Judo Olympic Team.  He competed in the 1992 Summer Olympics.

References

Year of birth missing (living people)
Living people
American male judoka
Olympic judoka of the United States
Judoka at the 1992 Summer Olympics
20th-century American people
21st-century American people